NICS  is a four-letter abbreviation with multiple meanings, such as:

 Network of International Christian Schools
 National Instant Criminal Background Check System in the United States
 Northern Ireland Civil Service
 Nucleus-independent chemical shift
 National Insurance Contributions (NICs) in the United Kingdom
 National Institute for Computational Sciences, a supercomputing center managed by the University of Tennessee

See also
NIC (disambiguation)